Solar is the first studio album by South Korean singer Taeyang, a member of boy group Big Bang. It was released via YG Entertainment on July 1, 2010, and was distributed in three formats—a regular edition, a deluxe edition (which was limited to 30,000 copies worldwide) and was made available for digital consumption. Four singles were spawned from the album: "Where U At", "Wedding Dress" and "I Need a Girl" (featuring bandmate G-Dragon) and "I'll Be There".

The international edition of the album, titled Solar International, was the first K-pop release to be sold worldwide on iTunes with both an audio and video album. The audio version (complete with a digital booklet) was made available on iTunes on August 19, 2010, while the video version (bundled with bonus behind the scenes documentaries) was released on September 10.

Singles
"Where U At" (featuring Teddy Park) was the first promotional single of the album. It was released on October 14, 2009. The music video shows Taeyang dancing with two back up dancers (choreographers), Lyle Beniga and Shaun Evaristo, in an alleyway. Teddy Park's rap shows him wearing a leather coat, while tossing an apple in one hand, on a motorbike. Taeyang wears black with the dancers and then changes to white at the dance break. In the end of the video, the dancers walk away and Taeyang walks down an alleyway looking back at a girl ("Wedding Dress" prequel).

"Wedding Dress", an R&B song, was released in November 2009, just a month after the release of "Where U At", making it the second promotional single of the album. 

"I Need a Girl" (featuring G-Dragon) was released in conjunction with Solar on July 1, 2010. An R&B track, its lyrical content consists of Taeyang expressing the type of woman he wants. Both the music video and dance version video features labelmate Sandara Park as Taeyang's love interest and includes appearances by G-Dragon. 

"I'll Be There" was released on August 23, 2010, and served as the second single from the album. The music video released for the track pays homage to "Thriller" by Michael Jackson, set against the backdrop of a graveyard and haunted mansion with a "lifeless, jerky choreography."

Accolades

Track listing

Charts

Weekly charts

Monthly charts

Year-end charts

Sales

Release history

References

2010 albums
Taeyang albums
YG Entertainment albums
Korean-language albums
Albums produced by G-Dragon
Albums produced by Teddy Park